Indrechtach mac Dungalaig (died 748) was a King of Brega from the Uí Chonaing sept of Cnogba (Knowth) of the Síl nÁedo Sláine branch of the southern Ui Neill. He was the grandson of Conaing Cuirre (died 662), a previous king. He ruled from 742 to 748.

In 743 he fought the Battle of Daim Deirg in Brega where he defeated Dúngal mac Flainn, king of Fir Chúl, who was slain. The Síl nDlúthaig sept of the Síl nÁedo Sláine had been allies of the Uí Chonaing in their rivalry with the southern Brega sept of Uí Chernaig and this is the first time these two septs are mentioned in conflict in the annals. Indrechtach is called king of Ciannachta (regis Ciannachte) in his death obit in the annals.

Notes

See also
 Kings of Brega

References

 Annals of Ulster at CELT: Corpus of Electronic Texts at University College Cork
 Mac Niocaill, Gearoid (1972), Ireland before the Vikings, Dublin: Gill and Macmillan

External links
CELT: Corpus of Electronic Texts at University College Cork
 Book of Leinster, Flann Mainistrech: Síl Aeda Sláne Na Sleg at CELT: Corpus of Electronic Texts at University College Cork

Kings of Brega
748 deaths
8th-century Irish monarchs
Year of birth unknown